This article features terminology unique to rowing.  For further information see main article Glossary of Rowing Terms

PLU Crew is the varsity rowing program for Pacific Lutheran University in Tacoma, Washington.  The team was founded in 1964 as a joint program with University of Puget Sound.  Today the team consists of Men's and Women's programs for both Varsity and Novice rowers, and competes as a member of the Northwest Collegiate Rowing Conference (NCRC) and Western Intercollegiate Rowing Association (WIRA).

History
Following the demise of the PLU-UPS rowing club, Pacific Lutheran rowers formed the Lute Varsity Rowing Club in 1965.

PLU Crew first received national notoriety in 1967, when University of Washington requested the return of their old shell the "Husky Clipper," which the Huskies had used to win at the 1936 Berlin Olympics.  In exchange, UW arranged for Green Lake Crew to donate a shell, the "Loyal Shoudy" to the PLU team.  Faced with no means of transporting the boat from north Seattle to PLU's home course in south Tacoma, team Commodore/Captain Jim Ojala devised a plan for the team to row the shell from Lake Union, through the Ballard Locks and down Puget Sound to the Tacoma Narrows.  After several months of endurance training, contacting the Navy and Coast Guard, and obtaining a parade permit to walk the shell through North Seattle from Green Lake to Lake Union, the ten team members prepared to embark on their journey.  The stunt resulted in the team receiving coverage of the event from the Seattle Post-Intelligencer newspaper, as well as national rowing magazine Rowing News.

The team received a major setback after its boathouse burnt to the ground in Spring 1975.

In 1998 the team moved up the lake to its new boathouse, located at Harry Todd Park in Tillicum.  The team shares the boathouse with UPS and Commencement Bay Rowing Club (CBRC), a Masters and Juniors program.

The team's last red cedar shell, the Marjory Anderson, was refurbished in 2004, and was located for display in the new college bookstore beginning in July 2007.

Meyer-Lamberth Cup
April 13, 2013, marked the fiftieth annual Meyer-Lamberth Cup.  The regatta between PLU and cross-town rivals University of Puget Sound Rowing is the oldest annual dual regatta on the west coast of the United States.

Meyer Cup Results (men's varsity eight)

PLU:  29 wins
UPS:  27 wins

Lamberth Cup Results (women's varsity eight)

PLU:  27 wins
UPS:  16 wins

Lightweight Program

PLU's lightweight rowing program have achieved some successes in recent years.  In 2002, the Men's Lwt 4+ traveled to the annual Dad Vails Regatta in Philadelphia, winning their event, and consequently a small college championship.  Though the Men's team has not returned to Dad Vails since 2002, they have since won the NCRC title in 2005 and 2007.

Not to be outdone, the Women's Lwt4+ won the 2004 WIRA Championships at Lake Natoma, California.  They followed up their win with second-place finishes in the event in 2005 and 2006.

Head coaches
Paul Meyer+ 1964-1965
J.R. Goerke+ 1965-1966
Jim Ojala 1966-1969
Norm Purvis 1969-1970
Ralph Neils 1971-1972
?? 1972-1973
?? 1973-1974
Dave Peterson 1974-1985
Bob Trondsen(M)/Elise Lindborg(W) 1986
Jeff Glenn(M)/Elise Lindborg(W) 1987
Doug Herland 1988-1991
Doug Nelson 1991-2000
Sarah Halstead 2001-2002
Tone Lawver 2002-2011
Thomas Schlenker 2012-2014 ++
Tara Brunsfield(M)2014-2015 ++
Lori Cark(M)2015-2016
Dave Harvey(M)2016-Present ++
Andy Foltz(W) 2015-Present ++

++ denotes  a non-PLU graduate

All-Americans 
1993
Brian Erstguard '93
2004
Lauren Rutledge '04
2005
Katie Schlepp '06,
2006
Katie Schlepp '06
Erin Wolf '06
2007
Amber Iverson '09
2008
Kat Jenkins '09
2009
Kat Jenkins '09
2010
n/a
2011
Abby Smith '12
2016
Hannah Peterson '19
2017
Hannah Peterson '19
2018
Hannah Peterson '19
2019 
Hannah Peterson '19
Madeline Woods '20

National Team Members
Sarah Jones '93, competitor in the Women's 8+ at the 2000 Summer Olympics and in the 2- at the 2004 Athens Olympic Games.
Doug Herland '73, Bronze medalist coxswain in the M2+ at the 1984 Los Angeles Olympic Games.
Bjorn Larsen '03, Silver medalist in the ML4- at the 2007 Pan American Games.
Elise Linborg '84, competitor at the 1996 Atlanta Olympic Games.

Current Fleet
Beauty and the Beast: 2- -vespoli
Lorraine: 2- -vespoli
Grødprinsess Anne (aka "The Frog"): Novice 4+ vespoli ultralight series
Scott Laio: Men's Lt4+ Pocock K series
Paul Hoseth (aka "Våt Drøm"): Men's 8+ Vespoli Mill. series
Doug "Herly" Herland: Women's Novice 8+ Pocock K series
Kristin Shay Paulson: Women's 4+ Vespoli Mill. series
Stille-Intensitet: Women's 8+ Pocock K series
TNT: Women's Lt4+ (Prototype for the Pocock K4+ series of racing shells)
Urokkelig Makt: Women's 8+ Pocock K series
Valborg: Novice 8+ Pocock K series
Valkyrie: Men's 4+ Pocock K series
Idunn: Men's 8+ Pocock K series
The Spirit of '02: Women's 8+ Pocock

Former Fleet
Gracias San Pedro: 4+ (Prototype Pocock Shell with golf-ball style dimples.  Never went into production.)
Husky Clipper: 8+
Lagprestajon: 8+
Loyal Shoudy: 8+
Marjory Anderson: 4+
Parodi: 8+
Return of the Sleipner: 8+
Sleipner: 8+

References

External links
www.golutes.com/wrowing
 Team Homepage
 PLU Crew Website
  2004-2005 Media Guide
  2005-2006 Media Guide
  2006-2007 Media Guide
  2007-2008 Media Guide
 PLU Website
 Row2k.com
LCAA - The Lute Crew Alumni Association

Crew
Rowing clubs in the United States